The 1989 Virginia Slims of Washington was a women's tennis tournament played on indoor carpet courts at the Patriot Center in Fairfax, Virginia in the United States and was part of the Category 5 tier of the 1989 WTA Tour. The tournament ran from February 13 through February 19, 1989. First-seeded Steffi Graf won the singles title.

Finals

Singles

 Steffi Graf defeated  Zina Garrison 6–1, 7–5
 It was Graf's 2nd singles title of the year and the 32nd of her career.

Doubles

 Betsy Nagelsen /  Pam Shriver defeated  Larisa Savchenko /  Natasha Zvereva 6–2, 6–3
 It was Nagelsen's 1st title of the year and the 19th of her career. It was Shriver's 3rd title of the year and the 119th of her career.

References

External links
 ITF tournament edition details
 Tournament draws

Virginia Slims of Washington
Virginia Slims of Washington
Virginia Slims of Washington
1989 in American tennis